Issam Abdallah Saif Al-Sabhi (born 1 May 1997) is an Omani professional footballer who plays as a forward for Saudi Arabian club Al-Okhdood and the Omani national team.

He debuted internationally on 10 October 2019 during a 2022 FIFA World Cup qualifier against Afghanistan in a 3–0 victory.

On 2 September 2021, Al Sabhi scored his first goal for Oman against Japan at the qualifying match in a 0–1 victory.

Career
On 2 February 2022, Al-Sabhi joined Saudi Arabian club Al-Okhdood. On 1 August 2022, Al Sabhi rejoined former club Suwaiq.

International career

International goals

References

External links
 

1997 births
Living people
People from Muscat, Oman
Association football forwards
Omani footballers
Oman international footballers
Omani expatriate footballers
Al-Shabab SC (Seeb) players
Suwaiq Club players
Al-Okhdood Club players
Oman Professional League players
Saudi First Division League players
Expatriate footballers in Saudi Arabia
Omani expatriate sportspeople in Saudi Arabia